The Uzbek goat breed from Uzbekistan is used for the production of mohair.

References

Goat breeds
Fiber-producing goat breeds
Goat breeds originating in Uzbekistan